Vella Gulf is a waterway in the Western Province of the Solomon Islands. It lies between the islands of Vella Lavella to the northwest, Kolombangara to the southeast, and Ghizo to the south. It connects New Georgia Sound ("The Slot") to the northeast with the Solomon Sea to the south.

During the Solomon Islands campaign in World War II, the Battle of Vella Gulf was fought here between destroyers of the Imperial Japanese Navy and the U.S. Navy on the night of 6–7 August 1943, with an Allied victory.

Notes
Citations

References

-Firsthand account of the battle by Japanese squadron commander aboard .

External links

Description by Vincent O'Hara
Order of battle

Bodies of water of the Solomon Islands
Gulfs of Oceania
Western Province (Solomon Islands)